Arrow Global Group is a European fund manager. It was listed on the London Stock Exchange until it was acquired by TDR Capital in October 2021.

History
The business was established as a debt collection business by Zach Lewy in 2005. It was the subject of an initial public offering in October 2013. 

In April 2015 the company bought Whitestar Asset Solutions and Gesphone - Serviços De Tratamento E Aquisição De Dívidas SA, both Portuguese debt purchasers. In September 2014 it acquired Capquest, another UK debt purchaser.

In May 2016 it bought InVesting BV, a Dutch debt purchaser. In August 2017 it announced the acquisition of Mars Capital's Irish mortgage servicing business. In January 2022 it acquired Maslow Capital, a provider of UK real estate development finance.

in 2020 Arrow Credit Opportunities 1 was launched with total capital commitments of €1.7 billion.

In October 2021, the company was acquired by TDR Capital.

Operations
The company has some 9 million customers.

References

External links
 Official website

Financial services companies established in 2005
2013 initial public offerings